Óscar Santor Martínez (born 3 April 1978 in Vitoria-Gasteiz, Álava), known as Golo, is a Spanish retired professional footballer who played as an attacking midfielder.

External links

1978 births
Living people
Footballers from Vitoria-Gasteiz
Spanish footballers
Association football midfielders
Segunda División players
Segunda División B players
Tercera División players
SD Eibar footballers
CD Badajoz players
Terrassa FC footballers
CD Toledo players
CD Ourense footballers
Mérida UD footballers
Extremadura UD footballers